Magnetic material synthesis and characterization technology continue to improve, allowing for the production of various shapes, sizes, and compositions of magnetic material to be studied and tuned for improved properties.  One of the places which has seen great advancement is in the synthesis of magnetic materials at nanometer length scales.  Nanoparticle research has seen a great deal of interest in a number of fields as many phenomena can be explained by what is occurring on the nanoscale, which can be probed more effectively using nanometer sized materials.  One unique type of materials which have seen a recent surge in research interest have been known as "nanoflakes" where they resemble flakes or discs of nanometer thickness and micrometer dimensions.  Nanomaterials of this shape have seen use in a number of fields including energy storage, as [electrodes] of electrochemical cells, and in cancer therapy to kill cancer cells.

References
D.-H. Kim, E. A. Rozhkova, I. V Ulasov, S. D. Bader, T. Rajh, M. S. Lesniak, and V. Novosad, “Biofunctionalized magnetic-vortex microdiscs for targeted cancer-cell destruction.,” Nature materials, vol. 9, no. 2, pp. 165–71, Feb. 2010.
R. P. Cowburn, D. K. Koltsov, a. O. Adeyeye, and M. E. Welland, “Single-Domain Circular Nanomagnets,” Physical Review Letters, vol. 83, no. 5, pp. 1042–1045, Aug. 1999.
S. Jain, V. Novosad, F.Y. Fradin, J.E. Pearson, V. Tiberkevich, A.N. Slavin, S.D. Bader, "From chaos to selective ordering of vortex cores in interacting mesomagnets", Nature Communications, Vol. 3, no.1330 DOI: doi:10.1038/ncomms2331 (2012)
Valentyn Novosad and Elena A. Rozhkova. "Ferromagnets-based multifunctional nanoplatform for targeted cancer therapy" Biomedical Engineering, Trends in Materials Science.  Chapter 18.
Buchanan, K. S., Roy, P. E., Grimsditch, M., Fradin, F. Y., Guslienko, K. Yu., Bader, S. D., and Novosad, V. Soliton pair dynamics in patterned ferromagnetic ellipses. Nature Physics 1, 172-176 (2005).
Xiaobin Zhu, Vitali Metlushko, Bojan Ilic, and Peter Grutter."Direct observation of Magnetostatic Coupling of Chain Arrays of Magnetic Disks" IEEE Transactions on Magnetics. Vol. 39. no. 5, September 2003.
E.A. Rozhkova, V. Novosad, D.H. Kim, J. Pearson, and R Divan."Ferromagnetic microdisks as carriers for biomedical applications" J. Applied Physics. 105. 2009.
Mi-Young Im, Peter Fischer,  Keisuke Yamada, Tomonori Sato, Shinya Kasai,  Yoshinobu Nakatani  & Teruo Ono “Symmetry breaking in the formation of magnetic vortex states in  permalloy nanodisk “ Nature Communications. (2012). 3. 983 
T. Shinjo, T. Okuno, R. Hassdorf,    K. Shigeto, T. Ono, “Magnetic Vortex Core Observation in Circular Dots of Permalloy ” Science, vol. 289. no. 5481, pp. 930 – 932  (2000)
A Wachowiak, J. Wiebe, M. Bode, O. Pietzsch, M. Morgenstern, and R. Wiesendanger, “Direct observation of internal spin structure of magnetic vortex cores.,” Science, vol. 298, no. 5593, pp. 577–80, Oct. 2002.
J. Raabe, R. Pulwey, R. Sattler, T. Schweinböck, J. Zweck, and D. Weiss, “Magnetization pattern of ferromagnetic nanodisks,” Journal of Applied Physics, vol. 88, no. 7, p. 4437, 2000.

Nanoparticles
Nanoelectronics